Dasht-e Shahreza (also Romanized as Dasht-e Shāhreẕā; also known as Deshneh-ye Shāh Reẕā) is a village in Farmeshkhan Rural District, in the Central District of Kavar County, Fars Province, Iran. At the 2006 census, its population was 358, in 74 families.

References 

Populated places in Kavar County